O'Rawe is a surname. Notable people with the surname include:

 Geraldine O'Rawe (born 1971), Northern Irish actress
 Pat O'Rawe (?–2017), Irish republican
 Richard O'Rawe, former IRA prisoner and author

See also
 Rawe (disambiguation)